Skyrock.com is a social networking site based in France that offers a free space on the web to allow its users to create blogs, add profiles, and exchange messages with other registered members.

Background and description
Skyrock.com began as a blogging site, Skyblog.com, founded by Skyrock CEO Pierre Bellanger in December 2002. In May 2007, after abandoning the Skyblog.com brand, Skyrock.com was launched as a full-scale social network.

As of June 2008 Skyrock was ranked as the world's seventh largest social network with over 21 million visitors.

Controversies
Skyrock has a high penetration rate in France. In several French middle schools, students used the platform to malign school personnel resulting in their expulsion and in the issuing of alerts by schools to warn parents and students about such behavior.

Furthermore, certain American newspapers attempted to associate the breakout of the 2005 civil unrest in France to users of Skyblogs. However, institutions of the French state never filed any formal complaint indicting the usage of Skyrock Blogs.

A few prominent French institutions created a Skyrock Blog as a preferred tool to communicate messages. An example is the French Equal Opportunities and Anti-Discrimination Commission.

References

External links
 

Internet properties established in 2002
Blog hosting services
French social networking websites